Prince Regent was launched at Rochester in 1811. She initially traded with the West Indies and the Mediterranean. From 1814 on she started trading with the Indian Ocean and India, sailing under a licence from the British East India Company (EIC). In 1820–1821 she transported convicts from Ireland to New South Wales. She continued to trade with Australia. In 1841–1842 she made a second voyage transporting convicts from Ireland, this time to Hobart. In about 1843 new owners shifted her home port to Hull. From there she traded with Quebec, the Baltic, Aden, and perhaps elsewhere. In 1863 she was at Alicante, Spain where she grounded. She was condemned as not worth repairing.

Career
Prince Regent first appeared in Lloyd's Register in 1811.

In 1813 the British East India Company (EIC) had lost its monopoly on the trade between India and Britain. British ships were then free to sail to India or the Indian Ocean under a licence from the EIC. Prince Regents owners applied for a licence to sail to certain ports in the East Indies under the provisions for whalers. They applied on 3 October 1815 and received the licence on 8 October.

On 7 May 1814, Prince Regent, Kerr, master, sailed from Gravesend, Kent for Isle of France (Mauritius). On 6 August she was at the Cape of Good Hope. On 19 February 1815 Prince Regent, Kerr, master, sailed from Batavia. On 8 August she was off Plymouth.

On 22 November 1815, Prince Regent, Clifford, master, sailed for India. On 18 March 1816 she arrived at Isle of France (Mauritius). On 11 December she was at St Helena, from Mauritius, and sailed for England. On 2 February 1817 she was at Deal, from Bengal. 

On 29 August 1817, she was at Gravesend, Prince Regent, Clifford, master, sailed for Bengal. On her way she stopped at Madeira. On 14 December she had reached the Cape. On 11 May 1818 she sailed from Bengal and on 8 October she was off Portsmouth; by 12 October she was at Gravesend. 

On 16 January 1820 Prince Regent, Clifford, master, arrived at the Cape from Bombay. On 6 April she was off Portsmouth.

1st convict voyage (1820–1821): Captain Francis Clifford sailed from Cork on 19 September 1820. Prince Regent arrived at Port Jackson on 9 January 1821. She had embarked 144 male convicts, none of whom died on the voyage. A detachment of the 1st Foot (Royals) provided the guard. On 14 February Prince Regent sailed for Batavia, which she reached. She sailed from Batavia on 8 August and was at Anjer Roads four days later. Prince Regent (late Clifford) arrived at Gravesend in December.

On 29 January 1824 Prince Regent, W.B.Lambe, master, sailed from England with 55 passengers for Hobart and Sydney. She touched at Bahia and arrived at Hobart on 2 July. On 31 July she sailed for Port Jackson. On 11 November she sailed for London.

Prince Regent, [William Buchanan] Lamb, master, sailed for Van Diemen's Land from Cowes on 22 October 1825. She touched at Madeira, which she left on 6 November, and arrived at Hobart on 1 March 1826. Her cargo included 250 Merino sheep, under the care of three German shepherds. Thirty of the sheep died on the voyage. The sheep were mostly intended for the Australian Company at Sydney. On 17 March she sailed for Sydney. On 22 April she sailed for Mauritius.

On 1 June 1826, Windsor Castle put into Mauritius leaking badly. There she was surveyed, condemned as a constructive total loss, and sold for breaking up. Prince Regent, Lamb, master, was engaged to take Windsor Castles cargo.

2nd convict voyage (1841–1842): Captain J.T.Barclay sailed from Gravesend on 1 July 1841, bound for Dublin to embark convicts for Hobart. Before leaving, he had embarked the guard for the voyage, two officers and 39 other ranks from the 96th Regiment of Foot. Prince Regent arrived at Kingstown and there embarked 181 male convicts. On 7 August she sailed for Hobart. She reached the Cape of Good Hope on 10 November. In addition to re-provisioning and taking on water, she also embarked five military convicts. She left the Cape on 21 November and arrived at Hobart  on 2 January 1842. She arrived with 182 convicts, three having died on the Journey. On 28 January she sailed in ballast for Singapore.

On 9 August 1859, Captain John Carrick, of Prince Regent, of Hull, died at the Cape. He was the last son of the late Captain John Carrick. She was on a voyage to Aden.

Fate
Prince Regent, Ellison, master, on 23 March 1863 ran aground and was damaged at Alicante, Spain. She was on a voyage from Hull. She was refloated on 7 April and found to be severely leaky. Prince Regent was consequently condemned.

Prince Regents entry in the 1863 volume of Lloyd's Register bears the annotation "LOST".

Notes

Citations

References
 
 

1811 ships
Age of Sail merchant ships of England
Convict ships to New South Wales
Convict ships to Tasmania
Maritime incidents in March 1863